The Third Menzies ministry (United Australia–Country Coalition) was the 27th ministry of the Government of Australia. It was led by the country's 12th Prime Minister, Robert Menzies. The Third Menzies ministry succeeded the Second Menzies ministry, which dissolved on 28 October 1940 following the federal election that took place in September. However, as a result of that election the government was reduced to minority status, and were forced to rely on the votes of independent crossbenchers Alexander Wilson and Arthur Coles to survive. The ministry was replaced by the Fadden ministry on 28 August 1941 following the resignation of Menzies.

Percy Spender, who died in 1985, was the last surviving member of the Third Menzies ministry; Spender was also the last surviving minister of the First Menzies ministry, Second Menzies ministry, Fadden ministry, and the Fourth Menzies ministry. John McEwen was the last surviving Country minister.

Ministry

Notes

Ministries of George VI
Menzies, 03
1940 establishments in Australia
1941 disestablishments in Australia
Robert Menzies
Cabinets established in 1940
Cabinets disestablished in 1941